Tyler Hill (born June 2, 1994) is an American professional stock car racing driver and team owner. He competes part-time in the NASCAR Craftsman Truck Series, driving the No. 56 Toyota Tundra for his team, Hill Motorsports. He has also driven in the ARCA Racing Series for Fast Track Racing and NASCAR Xfinity Series for MBM Motorsports in the past.

He is the son of former NASCAR driver Jerry Hill and the brother of current NASCAR driver Timmy Hill, who shares driving duties and co-owns the No. 56 truck with Tyler.

Racing career
Starting to race at the age of five, Hill did so racing go-karts. He later moved up to bandolero racing and the Allison Legacy Series, in which he claimed the 2011 national championship. Hill tested an ARCA Racing Series car for MBM Motorsports in January 2017 but did not debut in the series until August 2018, driving for Fast Track Racing at Berlin Raceway. He wound up running four races for FTR in 2018, culminating in a seventh-place in the season finale at Kansas Speedway, Hill's first top-ten in ARCA competition. In the race, Hill spun on lap two but advanced throughout the race due to a large amount of attrition in the race.

In November 2018, Hill made his NASCAR debut in the Xfinity Series, driving the No. 13 for MBM Motorsports at ISM Raceway. Hill spun during the later stages of the event and finished 15 laps in arrears to the leader.

Hill returned to MBM for the 2019 iK9 Service Dog 200, also at ISM, driving the team's No. 66 entry. Later in the year, older brother Timmy formed Hill Motorsports to compete in the NASCAR Gander Outdoors Truck Series, with him sharing the No. 56 with Tyler; the number was used by their father Jerry during his career. He debuted at Dover International Speedway in the spring. A spin in qualifying at Las Vegas Motor Speedway in September resulted in Hill's first series DNQ.

In the 2021 Chevrolet Silverado 250 at Talladega, Hill survived the race to finish 2nd place right behind the winner, Tate Fogleman.

Personal life
Hill graduated from North Point High School in 2012.

Motorsports career results

NASCAR
(key) (Bold – Pole position awarded by qualifying time. Italics – Pole position earned by points standings or practice time. * – Most laps led.)

Xfinity Series

Craftsman Truck Series

ARCA Menards Series
(key) (Bold – Pole position awarded by qualifying time. Italics – Pole position earned by points standings or practice time. * – Most laps led.)

 Season still in progress
 Ineligible for series points

References

External links
 

Living people
1994 births
NASCAR drivers
NASCAR team owners
ARCA Menards Series drivers
Racing drivers from Maryland
People from Port Tobacco Village, Maryland